William "Billie"/"Billy"G. Simpson (birth unknown – death unknown) was a professional rugby league footballer who played in the 1900s and 1910s.

Playing career

Challenge Cup Final appearances
William Simpson played , i.e. number 5, and scored a try in Wakefield Trinity's 17-0 victory over Hull F.C. in the 1909 Challenge Cup Final during the 1908–09 season at Headingley Rugby Stadium, Leeds on Tuesday 20 April 1909, in front of a crowd of 23,587.

County Cup Final appearances
William Simpson played , i.e. number 5, and scored a try in Wakefield Trinity's 8-2 victory over Huddersfield in the 1910 Yorkshire County Cup Final during the 1910–11 season at Headingley Rugby Stadium, Leeds on Saturday 3 December 1910.

Notable tour matches
William Simpson played , i.e. number 5, in Wakefield Trinity's 20-13 victory over Australia in the 1908–09 Kangaroo tour of Great Britain match at Belle Vue, Wakefield on Saturday 19 December 1908.

Club career
William Simpson is fifth on Wakefield Trinity's most tries in a season list with 34-tries scored in the 1910-11 season, he is behind; Fred Smith (38-tries in the 1959-60 season, and 37-tries in the 1958-59 season), David Smith (38-tries in the 1973-74 season), and Alan Skene (35-tries in the 1959-60 season).

References

External links
Search for "Simpson" at rugbyleagueproject.org

Place of birth missing
Place of death missing
English rugby league players
Rugby league wingers
Wakefield Trinity players
Year of birth missing
Year of death missing